The list of shipwrecks in 1971 includes ships sunk, foundered, grounded, or otherwise lost during 1971.

January

7 January

8 January

10 January

11 January

12 January

14 January

18 January

27 January

28 January

31 January

February

3 February

6 February

10 February

13 February

18 February

22 February

26 February

27 February

28 February

March

1 March

2 March

3 March

4 March

12 March

28 March

30 March

31 March

April

1 April

12 April

15 April

20 April

21 April

26 April

27 April

28 April

30 April

May

2 May

15 May

17 May

20 May

31 May

Unknown date

June

1 June

2 June

28 June

Unknown date

July

1 July

3 July

4 July

5 July

13 July

15 July

17 July

August

5 August

7 August

10 August

16 August

17 August

19 August

30 August

September

3 September

4 September

5 September

18 September

21 September

22 September

24 September

25 September

29 September

October

14 October

15 October

16 October

18 October

22 October

30 October

November

4 November

5 November

8 November

9 November

14 November

17 November

22 November

23 November

25 November

30 November

Unknown date

December

3 December

4 December

5 December

6 December

8 December

9 December

10 December

12 December

13 December

14 December

16 December

19 December

Unknown date

Unknown date

References

1971
 
Ships